211 West Fort Street is a 27-story skyscraper in Downtown Detroit, Michigan, currently owned by Bradley J. Foster and Foster Financial Company, Inc. Construction began in 1961, and finished in 1963. The building stands at the southeast corner of Fort Street and Washington Boulevard. It was constructed adjacent to the Detroit Trust Company Building, designed by Albert Kahn in 1915, as offices for the Detroit Bank and Trust Company, later known as Comerica. The bank occupied space in the building until 1993, when it moved to One Detroit Center. In the courtyard between the two buildings is a sculpture based on the bank's logo at the time.

The building currently houses offices for the Detroit Economic Club, United States District Court for the Eastern District of Michigan, Visit Detroit, Majorel, the United States Attorney and several other tenants.

Architecture
The building was designed in the International style by architects Harley, Ellington, Cowin & Stirton in 1961.  Tinted windows set into precast concrete frames create a unique grid pattern along the sweeping building façade.  The building's address "211" is displayed along the roof line.

A dynamic two-story lobby is wrapped with glass and recessed on the north and west sides allowing for a covered arcade on two sides. Elevator banks and other interior walls are covered with black granite and floors gleam with travertine tiles. Internationally acclaimed Rosetti Architects was recently commissioned to redesign the lobby with its stunning new signature style. The site slopes from north to south allowing for a service entrance and parking garage at street level facing Congress Street.

Gallery

See also
 List of tallest buildings in Detroit

References

Further reading

External links 

211 West Fort Street official site
Google Maps location of 211 West Fort Street

Skyscraper office buildings in Detroit
1963 establishments in Michigan
Office buildings completed in 1963
International style architecture in Michigan